Tokens is a Canadian comedy web series created by Winnifred Jong and produced along with Trinni Franke. The series premiered on Facebook and YouTube on May 6, 2019. It also stayed on Binge Networks for the first season and was later sold to Urbanflix TV.

Tokens follows the lives of the actors of an "on call" casting agency who are dispatched to productions in order to fulfill diversity quotas. The series stars Connie Wang, Ryan Allen and Shelley Thompson. As of October 2019, Tokens has amassed more than 500,000 combined views across Facebook and YouTube.

Plot 
The series follows the actors of On Call Casting, a fictional agency designed to help busy production companies meet their mandated diversity quotas. Dispatcher Betty sends out whoever is on call, with the actors often finding themselves cast in the roles they least expect.

Cast and characters

Main 

 Connie Wang as Sammie Pang, an aspiring actress who joins On Call Casting in the hopes that she will find acting work beyond stereotypical token roles, despite the growing disapproval of her traditional parents.
 Ryan Allen as DeMar Lowry, a stunt coordinator-turned-actor who befriends Sammie after joining On Call Casting.
 Shelley Thompson as Betty, the eccentric, entrepreneurial dispatcher of On Call Casting.

Recurring 

 Jessica Greco as Jessica AD
 Daniel Maslany as Dennis AD
 Chelsea Clark as Roxy
 Krystal Kiran as Priya
 Christina Song as Vivian, Sammie's Mom
 Russell Yuen as Bob, Sammie's Dad
Jonathan Cherry as Director #1
 Sharron Matthews as Director #2
 Amy Matysio as the Producer
Ted Stokes as the Cinematographer
 Samora Smallwood as Jenn the Costumer
 Sedina Fiati as Ese the Makeup Artist
Tyssen Smith as the College Brat

Guest 

Fuad Ahmed (credited as Gabe Grey) as Vasant
Andrew James McMichael as the Production Assistant
Abigail Nadeau as the Bored Ballet Dancer
 Ehren Kassam as Kruger the Driver
 Ella Jonas Farlinger as Teen Betty
Stephanie Morgenstern as the Casting Assistant
Leigh Cameron as Captain Anjelika
Sergey Volkov as Traktor
Tom Melissis as Director #3
Julia Huang as Sammie's Niece
Daniela Saioni as Director #4
Jeananne Goossen as Casting Director Voice

Episodes

Season 1 (2019)

Production 
The first season of Tokens was funded through the Telefilm Talent-To-Watch program and the Bell Fund. The series received additional funding through sponsorships from William F. White International and Grandé Camera (formerly Dazmo Camera).

Principal photography took place in November 2018 in Toronto.

In February 2019, Tokens creator Winnifred Jong and producer Trinni Franke participated in the Prime Time Throwdown pitch competition at the 2019 Prime Time in Ottawa conference, where they were awarded in-kind marketing services to support the release of the first season. The series premiered to a sold-out audience at the TIFF Bell Lightbox on May 6, 2019, the same day the first season was released worldwide on Facebook and YouTube.

Reception 
Tokens has received praise for its satirical depiction of the issues of tokenism and representation in the entertainment industry. Critics have noted the cultural relevance of the show's themes, with Greg David of TV, Eh? writing "Tokens couldn’t be more timely. Or scathingly on point." In a Calgary Herald review, Melissa Hank remarked that the series "tackles Hollywood diversity with grace and humour." Spring Marie Cullen of Starry Constellation Magazine wrote "it's smart, it's funny and it takes a unique look at the entertainment industry," concluding that "anyone who considers themselves a dreamer, no matter what career avenue they're headed down, will find enjoyment in this series." Writing for The TV Junkies, Bridget Liszewski described Tokens as "a funny, bold, tongue-in-cheek look at issues of diversity, inclusion, and representation."

As of July 2020, the first season of Tokens has been selected to screen at T.O. WebFest, Minnesota WebFest, NYC Web Fest, Bilbao Seriesland, NZ Web Fest, the Asia Web Awards, Santa Monica Webfest, Bogotá Web Fest, Apulia Web Fest, Miami Web Fest, Copenhagen Web Fest, New Jersey Web Fest, Santa Monica Webfest, DC Web Fest, Seoul Webfest, and Oakville Film Festival.

It boldly became the first short form series to be nominated as Best Ensemble at the 2020 ACTRA Awards, competing with Kim's Convenience, Baroness von Sketch, Anne with an E and the eventual winner, Schitt's Creek. It was nominated for four Canadian Screen Awards in 2020, where Winnifred Jong won for Best Direction, Web Program or Series.

Awards and nominations

References

External links 

Tokens official site

Canadian comedy web series